Bank of Georgia Group PLC (“Bank of Georgia Group”, the “Group”, or “BOGG” and on the LSE: BGEO LN) is a UK incorporated holding company. The group comprises a retail banking and payments business, and a corporate banking and investment banking business, both operating in Georgia. The company is listed on the London Stock Exchange and is a constituent of the FTSE 250 Index.

History
The bank was established in 1903, nationalized by the communists and became known as Binsotsbank before it was privatized again and renamed the Bank of Georgia in 1994.

Bank of Georgia was first listed on the Georgian Stock Exchange in 2001 and then merged with Tbiluniversalbank in 2004.

Starting from 2004, Bank of Georgia completed a number of strategic acquisitions, introduced a series of packaged retail products and initiated major infrastructure upgrades.

This is when the Bank launched its private banking, placed debut corporate bonds on the Georgian Stock Exchange.

The period following the listing was marked by its first Eurobond issuances, further acquisitions and new partnerships (e.g. American Express).

Bank of Georgia was listed on London Stock Exchange through global depositary receipts in 2007.

Bank of Georgia gained a premium listing on the London Stock Exchange in April 2012. On 15 June 2012 Bank of Georgia joined the FTSE 250 Index.

Bank of Georgia diversified its revenue sources by entering non-banking sectors in healthcare and real estate, which later became the Group’s Investment Business arm.

In 2017, the decision was made to demerge BGEO Group PLC into two separately listed and independently managed public companies – Bank of Georgia Group PLC, the Banking Business, and Georgia Capital PLC, the Investment Business. The Demerger was completed on 29 May 2018.

In 2018, Georgia Capital issued Eurobonds which were listed and traded on the Irish Stock Exchange.

In 2020, the European Investment Bank signed a €50 million loan deal with the Bank of Georgia for small and medium enterprises (SMEs) and mid-caps. Bank of Georgia typically lends the funds to local businesses, such as the Swiss Agricultural School Caucasus.

Operations
Bank of Georgia has one of the largest distribution networks in Georgia, comprising 211 branches, 989 ATMs, 3,134 self-service terminals and a call center.

Shareholders
As at 31 March 2022, the Group’s top ten shareholders were JSC Georgia Capital (19.90%), Harding Loevner LP (4.30%), Fidelity Investments (3.70%), Van Eck Associates Corporation (3.50%), M&G Investment Management Ltd (3.40%), Dimensional Fund Advisors (DFA) LP (3.40%), Vanguard Group Inc (2.50%), GLG Partners LP (2.40%), Tiger Management LLC (2.10%), Standard Life Investments (2.10%).

References

External links 

Bank of Georgia (English website)

Banks of Georgia (country)
Banks established in 1903
Companies based in Tbilisi
Brands of Georgia (country)
Companies listed on the London Stock Exchange
Companies listed on the Georgian Stock Exchange
Companies nationalised by the Soviet Union